Presidential yacht may refer to a vessel of a country's navy that would be specially used by the country's president. It is common for a vessel to be designated as the presidential yacht during a fleet review.

Some countries (below) have vessels permanently designated as presidential yachts:

List of presidential yachts

Egypt
The President of Egypt has the eighth largest yacht, El Mahrousa, as his presidential yacht.

Finland
The President of Finland has a small private yacht, Kultaranta VIII.

India
The INS Sumitra is the presidential yacht of India.

Italy
The Italian ship Argo (MEN209) is the presidential yacht of Italy.

Philippines
 Casiana (1936-1941), renamed Banahaw.
 Orchid (1946-1948)
 Dalisay (1948-1959), renamed Apo, Pagasa, and Santa Maria.
 RPS Lapu-Lapu (1959–present), renamed RPS Roxas, RPS The President, RPS Pag-Asa, and BRP Ang Pangulo.

Russia
Russia employed presidential yachts serving the Russian presidents, including:
 Olympia (2002–2009), was used by the Russian President Vladimir Putin during his first and second terms.
 Sirius (2010–), was firstly used by the Russian President Dmitri Medvedev
 Graceful (2018–), the most recent presidential yacht
The Russian government also employing the special vessel named Rossiya which was built during the Soviet Union, and used in the internal waters. In 2003 ship named Burevestnik was commissioned to serve the Russia's leaders.

Turkey
 Presidential Yacht Savarona – The current Turkish presidential yacht; prior to 2010 privately leased while her replacement (below) was in development
 New presidential yacht – The Turkish Government has currently commissioned a new  yacht for the personal use of the president and visiting heads of state. Details of this new yacht first surfaced in September 2008. The yacht is being built at the Istanbul Naval Yard, Pendik, Istanbul and is reported to have a ballistic hull, surface-to-air missiles and high-tech equipment.

United States
In the past, the United States employed presidential yachts serving the American president:
 USS Mayflower (1906–1929), was decommissioned as a result of economy measures just prior to the Great Depression.
 USS Potomac (1936–1945)
 USS Williamsburg (1945–1953)
 the most recent presidential yacht was USS Sequoia (1933–77).

Yugoslavia
The most famous is Galeb, the yacht of Marshal Josip Broz Tito.

See also
 List of motor yachts by length

References

Boat types